The Sogdian warriors were cavalry in Achaemenid army. The Sogdiana provided contingents of soldiers to the Achaemenid kings. And would later also be used by the Sasanian Empire as a infantry and cavalry unit.

See also
Clibanarii
Military of the Sasanian Empire
Cataphract

References

Military units and formations of the Achaemenid Empire
Iranian warfare
Sogdians